The Central Military District is a military district of the Armed Forces of the Republic of Uzbekistan based in the city of Jizzakh. It serves the territory of Dzhizak Province, Samarqand Province, and Sirdaryo Province.

Activities 
On 21 June 2019, the Central Military District and the Samarkand Regional Council of the Youth Union signed a Memorandum of Understanding for cooperation. During the COVID-19 pandemic in Uzbekistan, disinfection works were underway in the Samarkand Region in cooperation with the Central Military District.

Assets 

 Center of Spirituality and Enlightenment
 Junior Specialists Training Center 
 Kattakurgan Training Ground

In Jizzakh, a library owned by the Central Military District Command has about 8,000 books, of which 5,000 pieces world and Uzbek literature and 500 are history books and textbooks.

Leadership 

 Deputy Commander for Educational and Ideological Work - Lieutenant Colonel Nuriddin Kadyrov

References 

Military units and formations of Uzbekistan
Military units and formations established in 2000
2000 establishments in Uzbekistan